Elections to Craigavon Borough Council were held on 18 May 1977 on the same day as the other Northern Irish local government elections. The election used four district electoral areas to elect a total of 25 councillors.

Election results

Note: "Votes" are the first preference votes.

Districts summary

|- class="unsortable" align="centre"
!rowspan=2 align="left"|Ward
! % 
!Cllrs
! % 
!Cllrs
! %
!Cllrs
! %
!Cllrs
! % 
!Cllrs
! %
!Cllrs
! %
!Cllrs
!rowspan=2|TotalCllrs
|- class="unsortable" align="center"
!colspan=2 bgcolor="" | UUP
!colspan=2 bgcolor="" | SDLP
!colspan=2 bgcolor="" | DUP
!colspan=2 bgcolor="" | Alliance
!colspan=2 bgcolor="" | UUUP
!colspan=2 bgcolor="" | RC
!colspan=2 bgcolor="white"| Others
|-
|align="left"|Area A
|14.5
|1
|bgcolor="#99FF66"|45.9
|bgcolor="#99FF66"|3
|12.8
|0
|10.7
|0
|0.0
|0
|16.0
|1
|0.0
|0
|5
|-
|align="left"|Area B
|bgcolor="40BFF5"|38.2
|bgcolor="40BFF5"|3
|17.3
|1
|19.1
|1
|17.9
|2
|3.8
|0
|0.0
|0
|3.7
|0
|7
|-
|align="left"|Area C
|21.5
|2
|bgcolor="#99FF66"|28.5
|bgcolor="#99FF66"|2
|9.7
|1
|10.8
|1
|7.8
|0
|9.5
|0
|12.2
|0
|6
|-
|align="left"|Area D
|bgcolor="40BFF5"|46.0
|bgcolor="40BFF5"|4
|8.9
|0
|26.0
|2
|5.9
|0
|13.2
|1
|0.0
|0
|0.0
|0
|7
|- class="unsortable" class="sortbottom" style="background:#C9C9C9"
|align="left"| Total
|31.4
|10
|23.4
|6
|17.3
|4
|11.3
|3
|6.8
|1
|5.6
|1
|4.2
|0
|25
|-
|}

Districts results

Area A

1973: 1 x SDLP, 1 x UUP, 1 x Alliance, 1 x DUP, 1 x Independent Nationalist
1977: 3 x SDLP, 1 x Republican Clubs, 1 x UUP
1973-1977 Change: SDLP and Republican Clubs gain from Alliance and DUP, Independent Nationalist joins SDLP

Area B

1973: 2 x UUP, 2 x Alliance, 2 x Vanguard, 1 x Independent Unionist
1977: 3 x UUP, 2 x Alliance, 1 x DUP, 1 x SDLP
1973-1977 Change: DUP and SDLP gain from Vanguard (two seats), Independent Unionist joins UUP

Area C

1973: 3 x UUP, 1 x SDLP, 1 x Alliance, 1 x Vanguard
1977: 2 x UUP, 2 x SDLP, 1 x Alliance, 1 x DUP
1973-1977 Change: SDLP and DUP gain from UUP and Vanguard

Area D

1973: 4 x UUP, 2 x DUP, 1 x Vanguard
1977: 4 x UUP, 2 x DUP, 1 x UUUP
1973-1977 Change: Vanguard joins UUUP

References

Craigavon Borough Council elections
Craigavon